National Institute of Fashion Technology (NIFT) is an autonomous institute offering courses in fashion, designing, technology, and management. Its head office is located in New Delhi, India.

History
NIFT was established in 1986 under the Ministry of Textiles of the Government of India. It was declared as a statutory institute in 2006 and empowered to grant its own degree by the NIFT Act of the Indian Parliament.

Along with the Ministry of Textiles, NIFT is in the process of creating a India specific size chart.

The new digital disruptive pattern camouflage uniform adopted by the Indian Army in 2022 was designed in association with NIFT.

Campus 
NIFT currently has 18 campuses spread across the country. The first campus was established in 1986 in Haus Khaz, New Delhi. The campuses at Chennai, Kolkata, Gandhinagar, Hyderabad, and Mumbai were set up in 1995, followed by the Bengaluru campus in 1997. The campus in Bhopal was set up in June 2008, Bhubaneshwar in 2010, Jodhpur in 2010, Kangra in 2009, Kannur temporarily in 2008 but permanently in 2012, and Patna in 2008. Raebareli in 2007, Shillong in 2008, Srinagar in 2016, Panchkula temporarily in 2019 but permanently in 2022. Daman became the latest edition in the NIFT network established in 2022.

Labs and Facilities

Labs 
Computer labs
Photography lab
Pattern making & draping labs
Weaving labs
Dyeing & printing labs
Technology labs
Garment technology labs
Leather Design labs
Accessory Design labs

Student Facilities 
Library and Resource center
Hostel and Residency 
Canteen and Cafe
Health Care & other
On-campus Counsellor 
Gym and Sports center

Other 
Incubation Cell
Amphitheaters
Auditoriums

Academics

NIFT offers undergraduate, post-graduate, and doctoral programmes in design, management, and technology.

The list of programmes offered by NIFT are mentioned below:

Undergraduate education degrees 

 Bachelor in Design (B.Des.)
B.Des. (Fashion Design)
B.Des. (Leather Design)
B.Des. (Accessory Design)
B.Des. (Textile Design)
B.Des. (Knitwear Design)
B.Des. (Fashion Communication)
 Bachelor in Fashion Technology (B.FTech)
 Foundation Programme

Postgraduate 
 Masters in Design (M.Des)
 Masters in Fashion Technology (M.FTech)
 Masters in Fashion Management (MFM)

Doctoral education 

 PhD (Full time )
 PhD (Part time)

Continuing Education Programmes
 Multiple Programs

References

External links

 

Vocational education in India
Fashion design
Ministry of Textiles
National Institute of Fashion Technology
1986 establishments in Delhi
Educational institutions established in 1986